Oeste de Minas is one of the twelve mesoregions of the Brazilian state of Minas Gerais. It is composed of 44 municipalities, distributed across 5 microregions.

References 

Mesoregions of Minas Gerais